Saccogaster is a genus of viviparous brotulas. They are found in the western Atlantic and Indo-Pacific.

Species
There are currently eight recognized species in this genus:
 Saccogaster brayae J. G. Nielsen, Schwarzhans & Cohen, 2012
 Saccogaster hawaii Cohen & J. G. Nielsen, 1972
 Saccogaster horrida J. G. Nielsen, Schwarzhans & Cohen, 2012
 Saccogaster maculata Alcock, 1889
 Saccogaster nikoliviae J. G. Nielsen, Schwarzhans & Cohen, 2012
 Saccogaster parva Cohen & J. G. Nielsen, 1972
 Saccogaster staigeri Cohen & J. G. Nielsen, 1972
 Saccogaster tuberculata (W. L. Y. Chan, 1966) (Bagbelly cusk)

References 

Bythitidae
Extant Eocene first appearances
Taxonomy articles created by Polbot